George Doyle is a former Gaelic footballer and manager from County Laois.

He played on the Laois senior football team throughout the 1990s, primarily as a defender but also in midfield. During that period he was widely regarded as one of the top players in the country in his position as he was chosen to play on the Leinster team.

In 1991, he played on the Laois team beaten by Meath in the final of the Leinster Senior Football Championship.

In 1993, he was a member of the Laois team that won the All-Ireland Senior "B" Football Championship, while he won two O'Byrne Cup medals with Laois in 1991 and 1994.

With his club Courtwood, George won a Laois Junior Football Championship in 1986 and a Laois Intermediate Football Championship in 1987.

He was manager of the Laois under 21 Football team in 2005 and of the Laois minor football team in 2012 and 2013.

References
 2000 Leinster SFC v Westmeath
 1999 Leinster semi final v Dublin

Year of birth missing (living people)
Living people
Courtwood Gaelic footballers
Gaelic football managers
Laois inter-county Gaelic footballers